Claire Duck (born 29 August 1985) is a British long-distance runner.

In 2017, she competed in the senior women's race at the 2017 IAAF World Cross Country Championships held in Kampala, Uganda. She finished in 62nd place.

References

External links 
 

Living people
1985 births
Place of birth missing (living people)
British female cross country runners
British female long-distance runners